Dhruba K. Bhattacharyya is a senior member of IEEE and a professor in the department of Computer Science and Engineering in Tezpur University, Tezpur, Assam.

Early life and education

Career 
Bhattacharyya served as the Dean of School of engineering, Tezpur University from February 2013 to February 2016 and also as the Dean of Academic affairs from January 2016 to March 2021. He held the office of the Pro Vice Chancellor of Tezpur University from April, 2021 to September, 2022. Currently he is the vice-chancellor (in-charge) of Tezpur University.

Authorship 

 Network Anomaly Detection: A Machine Learning Perspective, with Jugal K Kalita, 2013, CRC Press
 DDOS Attacks: Evolution, Detection, Prevention, Reaction and Tolerance, with Jugal K Kalita, 2016,  CRC Press
 Network Traffic Anomaly Detection and Prevention: Concepts, Techniques, and Tools, with Monowar H. Bhuyan and Jugal K Kalita, 2017, Springer Nature
 Gene Expression Data Analysis: A Statistical and Machine Learning Perspective", with Pankaj Barah and Jugal K Kalita, 2021, CRC Press

References

External links 
 Publications
 Dhruba K. Bhattacharyya's Homepage
 Dhruba K. Bhattacharyya's publications indexed by Google Scholar

Academic staff of Tezpur University
1966 births
Living people